The Médiathèque José Cabanis is the main building of the Public Libraries of Toulouse. Situated next to the Matabiau rail station, it was built in 2002 by Buffi and named after José Cabanis, a poet who lived in Toulouse (1922–2000).

Library buildings completed in 2002
Libraries in France
Organizations based in Toulouse
Buildings and structures in Toulouse
Tourist attractions in Toulouse
2002 establishments in France
Libraries established in 2002
21st-century architecture in France